EvelynGeni: Evelyn Eustace Fannin Eustace Fannin (28 June 1915 – 25 November 1997) was a South African tennis player.

Fannin was born in Ixopo in June 1915 and educated at Hilton College. In 1947, he won the doubles title at the French Championships with compatriot Eric Sturgess defeating American Tom Brown and Australian Bill Sidwell in four sets. Two years later, in 1949, they again reached the doubles final but this time lost to the American team of Pancho Gonzales  and Frank Parker in four sets.

In 1947, he lost the final of the Netherlands Championships to Frenchman Henri Cochet.

Between 1937 and 1949, Fannin played seven times for the South African Davis Cup team and compiled a record of nine wins and seven losses. He died in Durban in November 1997 at the age of 82.

Grand Slam finals

Doubles (1 title, 1 runner-ups)

References

External links

 
 
 

1915 births
1997 deaths
French Championships (tennis) champions
Grand Slam (tennis) champions in men's doubles
People from Ubuhlebezwe Local Municipality
South African male tennis players
South African people of British descent
White South African people
Alumni of Hilton College (South Africa)